Glastonbury type pottery is a form of Iron Age pottery derived from earlier Gaulish art of the middle La Tène period. It was made in southwestern England and takes its name from the town of Glastonbury in Somerset.

References

Iron Age Britain
Romano-British pottery
Glastonbury
History of Somerset